In geometry, a normal is an object such as a line, ray, or vector that is perpendicular to a given object. For example, the normal line to a plane curve at a given point is the (infinite) line perpendicular to the tangent line to the curve at the point.
A normal vector may have length one (a unit vector) or its length may represent the curvature of the object (a curvature vector); its algebraic sign may indicate sides (interior or exterior).

In three dimensions, a surface normal, or simply normal, to a surface at point  is a vector perpendicular to the tangent plane of the surface at P. The word "normal" is also used as an adjective: a line normal to a plane, the normal component of a force, the normal vector, etc. The concept of normality generalizes to orthogonality (right angles).

The concept has been generalized to differentiable manifolds of arbitrary dimension embedded in a Euclidean space. The normal vector space or normal space of a manifold at point  is the set of vectors which are orthogonal to the tangent space at 
Normal vectors are of special interest in the case of smooth curves and smooth surfaces.

The normal is often used in 3D computer graphics (notice the singular, as only one normal will be defined) to determine a surface's orientation toward a light source for flat shading, or the orientation of each of the surface's corners (vertices) to mimic a curved surface with Phong shading.

The foot of a normal at a point of interest Q (analogous to the foot of a perpendicular) can be defined at the point P on the surface where the normal vector contains Q.
The normal distance of a point Q to a curve or to a surface is the Euclidean distance between Q and its foot P.

Normal to surfaces in 3D space

Calculating a surface normal
For a convex polygon (such as a triangle), a surface normal can be calculated as the vector cross product of two (non-parallel) edges of the polygon.

For a plane given by the equation  the vector  is a normal.

For a plane whose equation is given in parametric form 

If a surface  is given implicitly as the set of points  satisfying   then a normal at a point  on the surface is given by the gradient

since the gradient at any point is perpendicular to the level set 

For a surface  in  given as the graph of a function  an upward-pointing normal can be found either from the parametrization  giving

or more simply from its implicit form  giving  
Since a surface does not have a tangent plane at a singular point, it has no well-defined normal at that point: for example, the vertex of a cone. In general, it is possible to define a normal almost everywhere for a surface that is Lipschitz continuous.

Choice of normal

The normal to a (hyper)surface is usually scaled to have unit length, but it does not have a unique direction, since its opposite is also a unit normal. For a surface which is the topological boundary of a set in three dimensions, one can distinguish between the inward-pointing normal and outer-pointing normal. For an oriented surface, the normal is usually determined by the right-hand rule or its analog in higher dimensions.

If the normal is constructed as the cross product of tangent vectors (as described in the text above), it is a pseudovector.

Transforming normals

When applying a transform to a surface it is often useful to derive normals for the resulting surface from the original normals.

Specifically, given a 3×3 transformation matrix  we can determine the matrix  that transforms a vector  perpendicular to the tangent plane  into a vector  perpendicular to the transformed tangent plane  by the following logic:

Write n′ as  We must find 

Therefore, one should use the inverse transpose of the linear transformation when transforming surface normals. The inverse transpose is equal to the original matrix if the matrix is orthonormal, that is, purely rotational with no scaling or shearing.

Hypersurfaces in n-dimensional space
For an -dimensional hyperplane in -dimensional space  given by its parametric representation

Alternatively, if the hyperplane is defined as the solution set of a single linear equation  then the vector  is a normal.

The definition of a normal to a surface in three-dimensional space can be extended to -dimensional hypersurfaces in  A hypersurface may be locally defined implicitly as the set of points  satisfying an equation  where  is a given scalar function. If  is continuously differentiable then the hypersurface is a differentiable manifold in the neighbourhood of the points where the gradient is not zero. At these points a normal vector is given by the gradient:

The normal line is the one-dimensional subspace with basis

Varieties defined by implicit equations in n-dimensional space
A differential variety defined by implicit equations in the -dimensional space  is the set of the common zeros of a finite set of differentiable functions in  variables

In other words, a variety is defined as the intersection of  hypersurfaces, and the normal vector space at a point is the vector space generated by the normal vectors of the hypersurfaces at the point.

The normal (affine) space at a point  of the variety is the affine subspace passing through  and generated by the normal vector space at 

These definitions may be extended  to the points where the variety is not a manifold.

Example
Let V be the variety defined in the 3-dimensional space by the equations 

This variety is the union of the -axis and the -axis.

Uses
 Surface normals are useful in defining surface integrals of vector fields.
 Surface normals are commonly used in 3D computer graphics for lighting calculations (see Lambert's cosine law), often adjusted by normal mapping.
 Render layers containing surface normal information may be used in digital compositing to change the apparent lighting of rendered elements.
 In computer vision, the shapes of 3D objects are estimated from surface normals using photometric stereo.

Normal in geometric optics

The  is the outward-pointing ray perpendicular to the surface of an optical medium at a given point. In reflection of light, the angle of incidence and the angle of reflection are respectively the angle between the normal and the incident ray (on the plane of incidence) and the angle between the normal and the reflected ray.

See also

References

External links
 
 An explanation of normal vectors from Microsoft's MSDN
 Clear pseudocode for calculating a surface normal from either a triangle or polygon.

Surfaces
Vector calculus
3D computer graphics
Orthogonality